Calosoma vagans is a species of ground beetle in the subfamily of Carabinae. It was described by Pierre François Marie Auguste Dejean.

References

vagans
Beetles described in 1831